Kazanów may refer to the following places in Poland:
Kazanów, Lower Silesian Voivodeship (south-west Poland)
Kazanów, Masovian Voivodeship (east-central Poland)